Pádraig Tyers (20 October 1925 – 19 February 2010) was an Irish Gaelic footballer. He played for his local club Lees and was a member of the Cork senior inter-county team from 1954 until 1956.  Tyers also enjoyed a distinguished career as an Irish language scholar, author and educator.

References

1925 births
2010 deaths
UCC Gaelic footballers
UCC hurlers
Lees Gaelic footballers
Cork inter-county Gaelic footballers
Waterford Gaelic footballers
Munster inter-provincial Gaelic footballers
Gaelic football goalkeepers